Diary is the debut solo album by American guitarist and composer Ralph Towner recorded in 1973 and released on the ECM label.

Reception 
The Allmusic review by David R. Adler awarded the album 3 stars, stating: "It's a solo performance with a twist: Towner plays not only 12-string and classical guitars, but also very competent piano... Towner accompanies himself via overdubs, playing both guitar and piano for an effect vaguely reminiscent of Bill Evans' Conversations with Myself."

Track listing

Personnel
 Ralph Towner — twelve-string guitar, classical guitar, piano, gong

References 

1973 albums
Albums produced by Manfred Eicher
ECM Records albums
Ralph Towner albums